{
  "type": "ExternalData",
  "service": "page",
  "title": "Tampere/Keskustaajama.map"
}
Tampere urban area, is the largest urban area, taajama in the Pirkanmaa region, and the second largest urban area in whole Finland after the Helsinki urban area. At the end of 2018 it had a population of 337 541 with a land area of 277.54 km2, resulting in a population density of 1 216.2 inhabitants per km2 in the urban area.

See also
Helsinki urban area
Tampere sub-region

External links
Tampere urban area map at Wikimedia Commons

Geography of Finland
Tampere